Pig's organ soup or chheng-thng, is a Malaysian and Singaporean soup that is made from pork offal. The dish is a clear soup, served with other optional side dishes as well as rice.

Content and variations 

The broth is boiled from a mix of offal including liver, heart, intestines, stomach, tongue, pig blood curd, as well as pork meat slices, strips of salted vegetables, celtuce and a sprinkle of chopped onion leaves and pepper. 

Side dishes include braised tofu puffs, and eggs and salted vegetables sometime are served. The meal is usually served with a special chili sauce or soy sauce with chopped hot chili.

See also
 Sekba
 Pork blood soup
 List of Chinese soups
 List of soups

References

Malaysian soups
Singaporean cuisine
Pork dishes
Offal